Eubelodon is an extinct genus of gomphothere (a family in the order Proboscidea, which also includes modern elephants) which lived in North America during the Miocene Epoch. It contains a single species: Eubelodon morrilli. Like other gomphotheres, it had a superficially elephant-like appearance with a trunk and tusks.

Fossil distribution
 
Fossils are restricted to what is now the Great Plains of the United States. Remains were found in the Poison Ivy Quarry, Antelope, Brown County, Nebraska, and Tripp County, South Dakota.

Taxonomy
Eubelodon was named by Erwin Hinckly Barbour in 1914. It was synonymized subjectively with Trilophodon by Osborn in 1918 and again by Tobien in 1973 with Gomphotherium.

It was assigned to Gomphotheriidae by Erwin Barbour in 1914. It was then assigned to Rhynchotheriinae by McKenna and Bell in 1997, Carroll in 1988, Shoshani and Tassy in 1996, Lambert and Shoshani in 1998, and Shoshani and Tassy in 2005.

Taxonomic position among trilophodont Gomphotheres:

References

Miocene mammals of North America
Gomphotheres
Miocene proboscideans
Prehistoric placental genera
Fossil taxa described in 1914